Perochnoristhus penrithae is a species of beetles in the family Carabidae, the only species in the genus Perochnoristhus.

References

Orthogoniinae
Monotypic Carabidae genera